The 1905 Kingswinford by-election was a parliamentary by-election for the House of Commons constituency of Kingswinford, Staffordshire held on 3 July 1905.

It was triggered by the death of incumbent MP William George Webb. It was won by Conservative Henry Staveley-Hill.

Results

References 

1905 elections in the United Kingdom
By-elections to the Parliament of the United Kingdom in Staffordshire constituencies
Politics of Staffordshire
History of Dudley